Naumovskaya is a rural locality (a village) in Porozhskoye Rural Settlement of Onezhsky District, Arkhangelsk Oblast, Russia. The population was 10 as of 2010.

Geography 
Naumovskaya is located on the Onega River, 14 km southeast of Onega (the district's administrative centre) by road. Medvedevskaya is the nearest rural locality.

References 

Rural localities in Onezhsky District